The 2019 CAFL season was the second season of the China Arena Football League (CAFL).

Background 
After the 2016 season, the Dalian Dragon Kings and Shenzhen Naja relocated to become the Shenyang Black Rhinos and Wuhan Gators, respectively. In June 2017, it was announced that the 2017 season was being moved to the spring of 2018. In January 2018, the league postponed the start of their second season to continue to establish business partnerships in China. The league has targeted a return to play in the autumn of 2019.

In September 2019, the CAFL released an abbreviated schedule, with a two-game regular season and a playoff tournament featuring all four teams, with games played November 6, 9, 20 and 23. Uniquely among professional football leagues, the CAFL playoff seeds were set as part of the schedule, with the semifinal round (December 6) consisting of the two matchups that did not play in the regular season. The winners of the semifinal round will play for the championship two days after the semifinals, and the losers for a consolation game the same day. 

On November 8, the CAFL announced that the first game had been postponed to November 13. Two days later, the league announced that the regular season was canceled and that two of the four games scheduled would be played as exhibition games. In lieu of a regular season or semi-final playoffs, the CAFL instead held a single round-robin tournament with each team playing the other for 12 minutes, with no overtime in the event of a tie. The standings following those contests will then be used to seed the championship: the two lowest-ranked teams played a consolation round, and the two highest-ranked played for the CAFL championship. Both games were 24 minutes long, separated into two 12-minute halves, with overtime if necessary (which it was for the championship). The entirety of the CAFL tournament took place in Suzhou over the course of three days.

Standings
Wuhan Gators: 4–0
Beijing Lions: 2–2
Shenyang Rhinos: 1–3+
Shanghai Skywalkers: 1–3

+ = Shenyang secured third place by way of defeating Shanghai in the consolation game.

Draft

The 2017 CAFL Draft was held on July 10, 2017. 36 players were drafted with 18 of them being Americans and 18 players from China or who are of Chinese descent.

Round one

Round two

Round three

Round four

Round five

Round six 

Note: CN indicates Chinese national or of Chinese descent while IN indicates international players

Source:

References

China Arena Football League
2019 in American football
2019 in Chinese sport